Santos Edward Ortega (June 30, 1899 – April 10, 1976) was an American actor and comedian. He was best known for playing Will Hughes in As the World Turns, taking over from Will Lee, who had played the role from the first episode on April 2, 1956 to May 31, 1956. Ortega continued in the role until his death in 1976.

Biography

Early life
Ortega was born in New York City on June 30, 1899, to parents Rafael (born in Venezuela and of Spanish descent) and Isabella (née Corbett, from Ireland) Ortega. 
Rafael Ortega was a cigar maker by trade, which may have influenced his son's habit of cigar smoking throughout his career.

Ortega initially had aspirations of joining the priesthood and studied briefly at the St. Joseph's Seminary of the De La Salle Christian Brothers in Pocantico Hills, New York, but changed his mind after landing a series of small acting roles in a series of Broadway productions.

Stage
He began his career when he was 17 in the theater in "an extravaganza at the old Hippodrome Theater. Later, he went on tour with a singing group, returning to New York City to appear on the Broadway stage including roles in Jeb (1946), Puppets of Passion (1927), What Never Dies (1926-1927), What's the Use (1926), and Marilyn's Affairs.

Radio
As radio stations began to come on the air in large numbers, radio programs began to gain momentum, thus opening up new opportunities for Ortega.  He first worked in radio in comedy, appearing on a variety show, Blackstone Plantation, where he played a character named Don Rodrigo. Ortega later said that he was hired for the role after a casting director hired the young unknown based on seeing Ortega's name, assuming that he would be perfect for the role.

Despite Ortega's ethnic-sounding name, and the fact that he did have Latino origins on his father's side, he did not speak Spanish.  He came to learn that if he convincingly mastered a Spanish dialect, more work would come his way, and it did.

He served as straight man for the duo of Frank Crumit and Julius Sanderson. Ortega said, "It was a song and patter show, and I provided the laughter." He went on to be active in the medium, starring in The Adventures of Nero Wolfe (1943–1944) and narrating Gang Busters, as well as Stroke of Fate. Perhaps his most famous and notable radio role was Commissioner Weston on The Shadow. He played the title role in Bulldog Drummond (1942–43) and was heard in the daytime radio serials Valiant Lady (as Edward Curran), Perry Mason, 1948's Roger Kilgore, Public Defender, and as the title character in The Adventures of Charlie Chan (1947–1948), The Affairs of Peter Salem from 1949 to 1953, and Hannibal Cobb (1950–1951).

Throughout the 1930s and 1940s and into the 1950s and early 1960s, the prolific Ortega lent his remarkable range of voice characterizations to numerous other radio drama series such as Inner Sanctum, The Mysterious Traveler, Suspense, Casey Crime Photographer, The Eternal Light, The Columbia Workshop, The Big Story, Perry Mason, You Are There, Dimension X, and X Minus One.

He also originated the radio role of Inspector Queen on The Adventures of Ellery Queen.

Television
On television, he played Will Hughes (usually just referred to as "Grandpa") on As the World Turns, replacing Will Lee as of June 21, 1956. On November 22, 1963, he was in the middle of a scene with actress Helen Wagner when CBS suddenly cut in with the first bulletin on President Kennedy's assassination. (The cast, which was performing the episode live, was not yet aware of the situation.) Ortega continued in the role until shortly before his death in 1976.

Film
Ortega played character roles in two films during the 1950s: The Family Secret (1951) and Crowded Paradise (1956).

Personal life
Ortega was married twice. He married Evelyn Fairbank in 1926, but the couple had no children and later divorced. He later married Cynthia Beckett, 20 years his junior, when he was around 50 years old.  They would go on to have two children.

Ortega was a lifelong tobacco user who often smoked cigars during his radio shows. However, during his tenure on "As The World Turns," he was most often seen smoking a pipe.

Death
Ortega died on April 10, 1976, in Broward General Hospital in Fort Lauderdale, Florida, while he was visiting in that area. He was 76. Survivors included a son, a daughter and a sister. A memorial service was held April 25, 1976, at the Church of the Heavenly Rest in New York City.

Filmography
 As the World Turns (1956-1976): Will Hughes

References

External links
 
 

1899 births
1976 deaths
American male comedians
American male film actors
American male television actors
American male radio actors
American male soap opera actors
20th-century American male actors
20th-century American comedians
Male actors from New York City
American people of Irish descent
American people of Spanish descent
American people of Venezuelan descent
Hispanic and Latino American male actors